Rajesh Krishnan is an Indian playback singer and film actor. Although he is known for his works in Kannada films, he has sung in Kannada, Telugu, Tamil, Hindi and other languages Making his mainstream debut in the film Gauri Ganesha (1991), he has sung for many feature films, devotional albums, theme albums and commercials in a career spanning over almost two decades. He won Nandi Award for Best Male Playback Singer for the film Ninne Pelladata in (1996).

Personal life
Rajesh Krishnan has been married and divorced to Sowmya Raoh (Singer), Haripriya (dentist) and Ramya Vasishta (TV anchor and singer).

Filmography

As actor

Dubbing artist

Discography

Telugu songs

Tamil songs

Kannada songs

2015

2014

2013

References

1974 births
Living people
Male actors in Kannada cinema
Indian male film actors
Kannada playback singers
Tamil playback singers
Telugu playback singers
Male actors from Bangalore
Indian male voice actors
Singers from Bangalore
Indian male playback singers
20th-century Indian male actors
21st-century Indian male actors